Eleanor 'Ella' Juliet Spicer (née Adams, 1876 – 1958) was a New Zealand artist. Her work is included in the collection of the Museum of New Zealand Te Papa Tongarewa, Turnbull library and Hocken library.

Personal life 
Born in Lawrence, New Zealand in 1876, she was the daughter of Charles William Adams. Although she moved to Wellington in 1907, Spicer was primarily based in Auckland.

Career 
Spicer studied painting in Dunedin, under Fanny Wimperis and Girolamo Nerli. She began exhibiting from age fifteen and was known for her watercolour painting and landscapes. Up until 1907, when she married John Edward Diggle Spicer, she exhibited under the name Ella Adams.

Spicer exhibited with prolifically within New Zealand including the:
 Auckland Society of Arts from 1907
 Canterbury Society of Arts
 New Zealand Academy of Fine Arts
 Otago Art Society from 1894 to 190 as a working member0
 New Zealand and South Seas Exhibition in Dunedin taking place in 1925-6
Spicer was the mother of artist Peggy Spicer. She and her daughter traveled together to England and Egypt, with both exhibiting in Cairo.

Her work is included in the collection of the Museum of New Zealand Te Papa Tongarewa, Turnbull and Hocken libraries.

References

Further reading 
Artist files for Spicer are held at:
 E. H. McCormick Research Library, Auckland Art Gallery Toi o Tāmaki
 Hocken Collections Uare Taoka o Hākena
 Te Aka Matua Research Library, Museum of New Zealand Te Papa Tongarewa
Also see:
 Concise Dictionary of New Zealand Artists McGahey, Kate (2000) Gilt Edge

1876 births
1958 deaths
New Zealand painters
People associated with the Museum of New Zealand Te Papa Tongarewa
People associated with the Canterbury Society of Arts
People from Auckland
People from Lawrence, New Zealand
New Zealand women painters